Królewska may refer to:

Villages in Poland:
Bokinka Królewska, in Gmina Tuczna, within Biała Podlaska County, Lublin Voivodeship
Brzóza Królewska, in Gmina Leżajsk, within Leżajsk County, Subcarpathian Voivodeship
Brzeziny, Gmina Lubycza Królewska, in Gmina Lubycza Królewska, within Tomaszów Lubelski County, Lublin Voivodeship
Dąbrówka Królewska, in Gmina Gruta, within Grudziądz County, Kuyavian-Pomeranian Voivodeship
Kalinówka Królewska, in Gmina Jasionówka, within Mońki County, Podlaskie Voivodeship
Kamienica Królewska, in Gmina Sierakowice, within Kartuzy County, Pomeranian Voivodeship
Klwatka Królewska, in Gmina Gózd, within Radom County, Masovian Voivodeship
Kniazie, Gmina Lubycza Królewska, in Gmina Lubycza Królewska, within Tomaszów Lubelski County, Lublin Voivodeship
Królewska Wola, in Gmina Międzybórz, within Oleśnica County, Lower Silesian Voivodeship
Lubycza Królewska, in Tomaszów Lubelski County, Lublin Voivodeship
Modła Królewska, in Gmina Stare Miasto, within Konin County, Greater Poland Voivodeship
Moszczona Królewska, in Gmina Mielnik, within Siemiatycze County, Podlaskie Voivodeship
Nowa Wieś Królewska, Greater Poland Voivodeship, in Gmina Września, within Września County, Greater Poland Voivodeship
Nowa Wieś Królewska, Kuyavian-Pomeranian Voivodeship, in Gmina Płużnica, within Wąbrzeźno County, Kuyavian-Pomeranian Voivodeship
Rewica Królewska, in Gmina Jeżów, within Brzeziny County, Łódź Voivodeship
Siennica Królewska Duża, in Gmina Siennica Różana, within Krasnystaw County, Lublin Voivodeship
Siennica Królewska Mała, in Gmina Siennica Różana, within Krasnystaw County, Lublin Voivodeship
Topola Królewska, in Gmina Łęczyca, within Łęczyca County, Łódź Voivodeship
Warząchewka Królewska, in Gmina Włocławek, within Włocławek County, Kuyavian-Pomeranian Voivodeship
Wistka Królewska, in Gmina Włocławek, within Włocławek County, Kuyavian-Pomeranian Voivodeship

Administrative districts in Poland:
Gmina Lubycza Królewska, rural gmina (administrative district) in Tomaszów Lubelski County, Lublin Voivodeship, in eastern Poland